Sha Tin College (STC) is a co-educational international secondary school in Hong Kong and a member of the English Schools Foundation.

Established in 1982 as the Shatin Annexe based in the campus of KGV School in Kowloon Tong, the school relocated to 3 Lai Wo Lane, Fo Tan in 1985, adopting its present name.

Students 
For the 2020-21 school year, the school had 1389 students. In 2020, 65.8 percent of students were Chinese, a total of 894 students. The next largest group was Eurasians, then Caucasians.

Curriculum 
Sha Tin College currently follows the IBDP curriculum. Year 12-13 students have the option to choose between the IBDP and the IBCP (IB Career-related Programme).

Academics
Sha Tin College's IBDP program achieved a so-called 40-40 status (where over 40% of students achieve 40 points or above). One student at the college achieved the world's highest IGCSE maths score. In the college's history programme, a team won first place in the Hong Kong Bowl in MS category, and William Huang (Y9 as of 2016-2017) won the Bee, also for MS category on 22 April 2018. In the 2018 International History Bowl Asian Championships, the Sha Tin College History Bee and Bowl team achieved second in bowl (team) and Darren Ho Ching Lau (Y9) achieved third and William Huang achieved fifth.

Notable alumni 
 Dawen – Singer-songwriter
 Stephanie Ho – Singer, actress and golfer
 Vivian Kong – Professional Olympic Fencer
 Kaylin Hsieh - Professional Olympic Fencer
 Wesley Wong - Actor

As a Filming Location 
Due to the school's location in the Hills as well as for logistical reasons, Sha Tin College has been a filming location for several TV shows and movies, most noticeably Fight Back to School

See also 
 English Schools Foundation
 List of secondary schools in Hong Kong

Notes and references

External links 

 

English Schools Foundation schools
Educational institutions established in 1982
Secondary schools in Hong Kong
Fo Tan
International Baccalaureate schools in Hong Kong
1982 establishments in Hong Kong